Admiral Sir David John Hallifax,  (3 September 1927 – 23 August 1992) was a senior Royal Navy officer who served as Constable and Governor of Windsor Castle from 1988 until 1992.

Naval career
Hallifax was educated at Winchester College, joined Britannia Royal Naval College, Dartmouth as a cadet in 1945 and spent his early years in minesweepers based in the eastern Mediterranean. His first command was as a young lieutenant in the fast patrol boat MTB5008.

Following an appointment to the Ministry of Defence as Director of Naval Operational Requirements, he became Flag Officer First Flotilla, a position once held by his father. It was from here that he went to the Northwood Headquarters as Chief of Staff to Admiral Sir John Fieldhouse, Commander-in-Chief Fleet in 1980. As Chief of Staff he was responsible for the day-to-day control of the Headquarters during the Falklands War. His next appointment was to the United States of America as the NATO Deputy Supreme Allied Commander Atlantic in 1982. His final appointment was Commandant of the Royal College of Defence Studies in 1986.

Hallifax retired from the navy in 1987. He was a keen yachtsman, competing in the 1971 Admirals Cup aboard the 'Prospect of Whitby'. He was a skilled woodworker, with a particular interest in fine reproduction furniture.

In 1988 Hallifax was made Constable and Governor of Windsor Castle. He died of motor neurone disease in 1992.

References

|-

|-

 

1927 births
1992 deaths
Graduates of Britannia Royal Naval College
Knights Commander of the Order of the British Empire
Knights Commander of the Order of the Bath
Knights Commander of the Royal Victorian Order
People educated at Winchester College
Royal Navy admirals
Royal Navy personnel of the Falklands War
Neurological disease deaths in the United Kingdom
Deaths from motor neuron disease